Paradrillia patruelis is a species of sea snail, a marine gastropod mollusk in the family Horaiclavidae.

Description
The length of the shell attains 18 mm.

The reddish brown shell shows a white narrow band on the periphery, and, on the body whorl, a second inferior band. It contains 12½ whorls, with obsolete flexuous longitudinal plications, crossed by revolving lines. These are nodulous at the periphery, and less distinctly so inferiorly. The operculum has a subcentral nucleus.

Distribution
This marine species occurs off Korea, the Philippines and off Réunion; in the Bohai Gulf and Yellow Sea.

References

 Liu J.Y. [Ruiyu] (ed.). (2008). Checklist of marine biota of China seas. China Science Press. 1267 pp.

External links
  Tucker, J.K. 2004 Catalog of recent and fossil turrids (Mollusca: Gastropoda). Zootaxa 682:1–1295.
 
  Baoquan Li 李宝泉 & R.N. Kilburn, Report on Crassispirinae Morrison, 1966 (Mollusca: Neogastropoda: Turridae) from the China Seas; Journal of Natural History 44(11):699–740 · March 2010; DOI: 10.1080/00222930903470086

 patruelis
Gastropods described in 1875